Fight Like Apes is the third and final studio album from Irish band Fight Like Apes. It was released in Ireland on May 15, 2015, and in the UK and internationally on May 18, 2015.

The first commercial single release from the LP was "Pretty Keen on Centerfolds", released on May 9. Some of the tracks which appear on the album previously appeared on their Whigfield's Sextape EP in 2014.

Recordings
The album was supported by a Fund It campaign launched in 2013. The crowdfunding campaign proved successful and was completed within a matter of days. The fund it campaign raised the required €20,000.

The crowd funding occurred due to the band and their previous label Model Citizen parting ways. After much delay the band announced the release of a new EP titled in Whigfield Sextape released on May 9, 2014 in Ireland.

Artwork
The artwork for the album and singles is produced by Loreana Rushe who has previously worked on their other albums and singles.

Track listing

Personnel
MayKay - Synth, vocals
Pockets - Synth, vocals

References

2015 albums
Fight Like Apes albums
Alcopop! Records albums